Georgi Stankov (born 10 August 1943 in Kosharevo, Bulgaria) is a boxer from  Bulgaria. He competed for Bulgaria in the 1968 Summer Olympics held in Mexico City, Mexico in the light-heavyweight event where he finished in third place.  He returned to the Olympics four years later in Munich but lost in the first round.

References

1943 births
Light-heavyweight boxers
Olympic boxers of Bulgaria
Olympic bronze medalists for Bulgaria
Boxers at the 1968 Summer Olympics
Boxers at the 1972 Summer Olympics
Living people
Olympic medalists in boxing
Medalists at the 1968 Summer Olympics
Bulgarian male boxers